Death Ray Vision is an American hardcore punk band from Massachusetts. The band includes members and former members of the bands Killswitch Engage, Shadows Fall, Cannae, Seemless, and Overcast.

The band released their first studio album titled We Ain't Leavin' Till You're Bleedin''' in 2013. The band also released an EP in 2011 titled Get Lost or Get Dead. In 2018 the band released a second LP titled Negative Mental Attitude. The band's third album, No Mercy from Electric Eyes, is set for release in the summer of 2023.

 Members 
 Current members 
Pete Cortese – guitar (2010–present)
Mike D'Antonio – bass (2010–present)
Colin Conway – drums (2010–present)
Chris Rosati – guitar (2018–present)
Keith Bennett – vocals (2023–present)

 Former members 
Brian Fair – vocals (2010–2018)
Zack Wells – guitar (2010–2018)
Jeff Gard – vocals (2018–2023)

 Discography 
 Studio albums 
 We Ain't Leavin' Till You're Bleedin (2013)
 Negative Mental Attitude (2018)
 No Mercy from Electric Eyes (2023)

 EPs 
 Get Lost or Get Dead'' (2011)

References 

Metalcore musical groups from Massachusetts
Heavy metal musical groups from Massachusetts
Musical groups established in 2013
2013 establishments in Massachusetts